Arnoul Gréban (Le Mans before 1420 – Florence ca. 1485), a French organist at the Cathedrale Notre Dame de Paris, authored a Mystère de la Passion and with his brother Simon Gréban the Mystère des Actes des Apôtres.

Gréban may have come from the diocese of Cambrai; he lived in France and Italy. He then served Charles, Count of Maine, until the death of the latter in 1472. He then left to Italy, was chaplain of San Lorenzo in Florence in 1476 and responsible for music at the House of Medici until 1485.

See also 
 Medieval French literature

Bibliography 
 Pierre Champion, "Arnoul Gréban, l'auteur du Mystère de la Passion", in Histoire poétique du XVe, Paris, 1923
 Henri Stein, "Arnoul Gréan, poète et musicien", in Bibliothèque de l'École des Chartes, t. 79, 1918, 
 Darwin Smith (born 1951), Arnoul Gréban. Clerc, chanteur et pédagogue entre la France et l'Italie au XVe siècle, Thèse, Paris 1, 2010.

External links 
 
 http://www.arlima.net/ad/arnoul_greban.html (Schriftenverzeichnis und Literatur)

See also 
 Mystery play

15th-century French dramatists and playwrights
French classical organists
French male organists
Cathedral organists
Year of birth uncertain
1480s deaths
Male classical organists